This is an incomplete list of Bond University people, including alumni and staff.

Alumni

Academic
 Terry Gygar, legal academic
 Vijay Patil, President, DY Patil University – Mumbai, India

Business
 David Baxby, CEO, Virgin Management Asia Pacific
 Patrick Baynes, entrepreneur
 Fiona de Jong, former CEO, Australian Olympic Committee
 John Osbourne, CEO, Cronulla-Sutherland Sharks
 Richard Richards, CFO, Seven Group Holdings
 Tom Seymour, CEO, PwC Australia
 Tommy Spaulding, businessman and author

Government

Politicians

Federal politicians
 Steven Ciobo, federal Member for Moncrieff
 Tim Watts, federal Member for Gellibrand, since 2013
 John McVeigh, federal Member for Division of Groom

State and territory politicians
 Lex Bell, Member of the Legislative Assembly of Queensland (2001–2004)
 Verity Barton, Member of the Legislative Assembly of Queensland, since 2012
 Andrew McIntosh, member of the Victorian Legislative Assembly

International politicians
 Brian Jean, the Leader of the Opposition in Alberta, Canada
 Tupou VI, King of Tonga (2012–present), former High Commissioner to Australia, former Prime Minister of Tonga (2000–2006)
 Rakuita Vakalalabure, Fijian politician

Humanities

Arts
 Luke Baines, actor
 Naomi McGill, designer, Harlette Saudi Arabia lingerie
 Radha Stirling, community activist

Journalism and media
 Caroline Graham, Walkley-award winning investigative journalist
 Sara Groen, television presenter
 Wendy Kingston, Nine News presenter
 Hazel Villa, journalist
 Vanessa Grimm, Sky News Live anchor
 Matthew Sait, Lawyer, Chairman of the Australian Monarchist League's ACT & Region Branch, media spokesperson
 Jemima Burt, journalist, ABC news reporter

Literature, writing and poetry
 Trevor Carolan, fiction writer
 Samantha Strauss, screenwriter and creator of Dance Academy
 Antony Szeto, film director
 Tommy Wirkola, film director, producer and screenwriter

Sport

 Chris Atkinson, WRC driver
 Courtney Atkinson, triathlete
 Lara Davenport, swimmer
 Chris Fydler, swimmer
 Grant Hackett, swimmer
 Isabella Rositano, multi-sport athlete 
 Nuko Hifo, rugby league player
 Ky Hurst, Ironman and swimmer
 Daniel Kowalski, swimmer
 Jason Little, rugby player
 Annabel Luxford, triathlete
 Michael Murphy, former Olympian diver
 Giaan Rooney, swimmer
 Andrew Utting, Olympic baseball player
 Annabelle Williams, swimmer

Administration

Chancellors

Notes

Vice-chancellors

Faculty

Notable past and current faculty members include:
 Babette Bensoussan, competitive intelligence specialist
 Jonathan Crowe, legal philosopher
 David Day, historian
 Mike Grenby, journalist
 Terry Gygar, legal academic
 Peter Harrison, PhD DLitt historian
 Ken Harvey, medical researcher and academic
 Richard Hays, medical lecturer
 Jon Jenkins, virologist and information technologist 
 L. Randolph Lowry III, political scientist
 Ingo Petzke, film scholar
 David Weedon, dermatopathologist
 Paul Wilson, criminologist

References

Bond
Bond University people